Aiouea guatemalensis  is a plant species in the family Lauraceae. It is endemic to Guatemala where it has only been found in the departments of Petén, Alta Verapaz and Izabal. It is a tree or shrub of up to 8 m that grows in tall broadleaf forest in association with Orbignya species.

References

guatemalensis
Endemic flora of Guatemala
Trees of Guatemala
Plants described in 1982
guatemalensis